The Sign of the Malay (German:Das Zeichen des Malayen) is a 1920 German silent film directed by Carl Heinz Boese. It was shot at the Babelsberg Studios in Berlin, then controlled by Decla-Bioscop.

Cast
 Alexander Antalffy
 Kurt Brenkendorf
 Ally Kay

References

Bibliography
 Jacobsen, Wolfgang. Babelsberg: das Filmstudio. Argon, 1994.
 Shulamith Behr, David Fanning & Douglas Jarman. Expressionism Reassessed. Manchester University Press, 1993.

External links

1920 films
Films of the Weimar Republic
German silent feature films
Films produced by Erich Pommer
German black-and-white films
Films shot at Babelsberg Studios